Amurrhyparia is a monotypic tiger moth genus in the family Erebidae erected by Vladimir Viktorovitch Dubatolov in 1985. Its only species, Amurhyparia leopardina, was first described by Embrik Strand in 1919. It is found in Russia (southeastern Transbaikalia, Amur, and Primorye) and China (Heilongjiang, Shanxi, Gansu, Qinghai, Tibet, and Sichuan).

References

External links

Arctiini
Monotypic moth genera
Moths of Asia